Space Pioneer Awards or NSS Space Pioneer Awards are the annual awards given by National Space Society, an independent non-profit educational membership organisation, to individuals and teams who have opened the space frontier.

The awards are given in 13 categories. Generally, three or more Space Pioneer awards are given per year, so not every category is awarded each year.

Categories
The 13 categories in which award could be given are:

 Business / Corporate
 Business / Entrepreneur
 Compelling Art
 Educator / Education
 Government Service (Non-legislative)
 Government Service (Legislative)
 Mass Media
 Public Awareness
 Scientist / Engineer
 Service to the Space Community
 Space Development
 Special Merit
 Wide Media

List of recipients
 2018 - Thomas Mueller [Science and Engineering] 
 2015 - Indian Space Research Organisation (ISRO), (Mars Orbiter Mission)

 2011 - Elon Musk [Business Entrepreneur]
 2011 - Robert Bigelow [Space Development]
 2011 - X-51A Waverider Team [Science and Engineering]
 2011 - Paul Spudis [Scientific or Engineering Paper]
 2011 - Gordon R. Woodcock [Lifetime of Service to the Space Community]
 2011 - George T. Whitesides [Service to the Space Community]

2010 - Ray D. Bradbury [Mass Media]
2010 - George T. Whitesides [Service to the Space Community]
2010 - NASA-Ames LCROSS Mission Team [Science and Engineering]

2009 - Indian Space Research Organization (ISRO) [Science and Engineering]
2009 - John C. Mankins [Space Development]
2009 - Brian G. Marsden [Service to the Space Community]
2009 - Russell L. Schweickart [Historic Space Achievement]

2008 - "The Caballeros" Col. Mike Hornitschek, USAF, Col. M.V. “Coyote” Smith, USAF, Lt. Col. Peter Garretson, USAF, Lt. Col. Paul Damphousse, USMC, and Gen. James Armor (Ret.) [Space Development]
2008 - Anita E. Gale [Education]
2008 - Al Globus [Education]
2008 - Patricia Grace Smith [Government Service (Non-legislative)]

2007 - Kenneth Cox [Space Development]
2007 - Heinz-Hermann Koelle [Special Merit]

2006 - Elon Musk [Business/Entrepreneur]
2006 - JAXA HAYABUSA (MUSES-C) Mission Team [Scientist/Engineer]
2006 - Michael Griffin [Space Development]

2005 - Paul Allen [Business/Entrepreneur]
2005 - Mars Exploration Rover Team, accepted by Dr. Steven Squyres [Scientist/Engineer]
2005 - Dr. Boris Smeds, ESA, for Cassini/Huygens mission [Scientist/Engineer]

2004 - Rep. Sherwood Boehlert [Government Service (Legislative)]
2004 - Gary Pearce Barnhard [Special Merit - Space Activist of the Year]
2004 - Randall Severy [Special Merit - Space Activist of the Year]

2001 - Leonard David [Mass Media]
2001 - Dr. Robert Farquhar, Mission Director, and the Near Earth Asteroid Rendezvous (NEAR) Mission Team [Scientist/Engineer]

1998 - George French for MoonLink [Business/Entrepreneur]
1998 - Alan Binder [Scientist/Engineer]

1997 - Greg Allison [Business/Entrepreneur]
1997 - Rep. James Sensenbrenner, for Commercial Space Act of 1997 [Government Service (Legislative)]
1997 - Mars meteorite team [Scientist/Engineer]
1997 - Lori Garver [Special Merit]

1996 - Charlie Chafer [Business/Entrepreneur]
1996 - Jeff Kluger [Mass Media]
1996 - Peter Diamandis [Special Merit]

1995 - Glenn Heinmiller [Mass Media]
1995 - General Daniel Graham [Special Merit]
1995 - Dr. Mark Albrecht [Special Merit]

1994 - Dr. Stewart Nozette [Scientist/Engineer]
1994 - Tim Kyger [Special Merit]

1993 - McDonnell Douglas Space Systems Delta Clipper Team [Business/Corporate]
1993 - Dr. Daniel Goldin [Special Merit]

1992 - Westinghouse Electric Corporation Commercial and Civil Space Division [Business/Corporate]
1992 - Barbara Morgan [Education]
1992 - Sen. Barbara Mikulski [Government Service (Legislative)]

1991 - Women in Aerospace [Public Awareness]
1991 - K. Eric Drexler [Space Development]

1990 - Orbital Sciences Corporation [Business/Corporate]
1990 - Virginia’s Center for Innovative Technology [Business/Entrepreneur]
1990 - Rep. Ron Packard [Government Service (Legislative)]
1990 - Lyman Spitzer, Jr. [Scientist/Engineer]

1989 - 3M Corporation [Business/Corporate]
1989 - James Bennett [Business/Entrepreneur]
1989 - Pat Rawlings [Compelling Art]
1989 - The Challenger Center [Education]
1989 - Sen. Jake Garn [Government Service (Legislative)]
1989 - Wendell Mendell [Scientist/Engineer]

1988 - Gilbert W. Keyes, Boeing [Business/Corporate]
1988 - Byron Lichtenberg [Business/Entrepreneur]
1988 - Dermot Burke and the Princeton Ballet for “A Tribute” [Compelling Art]
1988 - Kamil Naguib, World Aerospace Education Foundation [Education]
1988 - Rep. George Brown, Jr. [Government Service (Legislative)]
1988 - Doug Morrow, Richard MacLeod, U.S. Space Foundation [Mass Media]
1988 - Thomas Rogers [Scientist/Engineer]
1988 - Craig Covault [Wide Media]

See also

 List of space technology awards

References

Space advocacy organizations
Space-related awards